Bob Acres is a small unincorporated community in rural Iberia Parish, Louisiana, United States. It was established as a train station by American actor Joseph Jefferson, who owned nearby Orange Island (now Jefferson Island, Louisiana), an inland salt dome that only appeared to be an island from a distance. Jefferson named Bob Acres after the character Bob Acres in The Rivals, one of the plays in which the actor appeared.

See also 

 Joseph Jefferson House

References

Acadiana
Unincorporated communities in Iberia Parish, Louisiana
Unincorporated communities in Louisiana